The 2000–01 season was the 61st season in the existence of Olympique Lyonnais and the club's 12th consecutive season in the top flight of French football. They participated in the Ligue 1, the Coupe de France, the Coupe de la Ligue and the UEFA Champions League.

Players

First-team squad

Transfers

In

Out

Pre-season and friendlies

Competitions

Overall record

Division 1

League table

Results summary

Results by round

Matches

Coupe de France

Coupe de la Ligue

UEFA Champions League

Third qualifying round

First group stage

Second group stage

Statistics

Goalscorers

References 

French football clubs 2000–01 season
Olympique Lyonnais seasons